Sree Ramar Temple is a temple for the Hindu god Rama, who is the presiding deity. It is located at the junction of Changi Village Road and Loyang Avenue in the east of Singapore.

History
The temple started with a shrine at the foot of a tree at the present temple site. The shrine was a place of worship for the people in the nearby localities. Ram Naidu, from the British Indian Army, secured the present site of the temple from the British at the end of the Second World War and built the temple. Over time, people living in the surrounding areas came there to participate in the daily prayers and activities.

The Loyang Avenue Redevelopment Project almost forced the temple to relocate; however, with the steady resolve of the temple's supporters and with the assistance of Mr Teo Chong Tee, then Member of Parliament for Changi, the temple won its fight to keep its premises. And it continues to serve the spiritual needs of Singaporeans living in the eastern part of Singapore at its present location in Changi.

The unique aspect of this temple lies in its amalgamation of three Hindu temples:

 Sri Manmatha Karunaya Eswarar temple, which was located at 249 Cantonment Road
 Sri Muthu Mariamman temple, which was located at the former Singapore Turf Club
 Sri Palani Aandavar Shrine, which was located at Kranji Sea.

Management Committee
In the early 1990s, a pro-term committee was formed and a proposed constitution for the temple was drafted. On 26 January 1993, it was officially registered as a Society with the Registrar of Societies, which was a significant milestone in the temple's history. Subsequently, the first management committee was formed to take over the affairs of the temple under the leadership of Mr N.K. Sundarajoo.

Religious and social activities
The Sree Ramar temple has seen a steady increase in its congregation due to the establishment of public housing estates in Tampines, Pasir Ris, Simei and the East Coast. To serve the increasing Hindu community, the management committee organizes several annual religious activities, such as:

Ramar Navami
Hanuman Jayanthi
Navarathiri festival
Thiruvilakku pooja
Chandi homams

The temple serves the social and educational needs of the devotees by organizing activities for families and children. To serve the local community better, the temple recently underwent sculptural, repainting and general renovation work.

Buddhism gods
The temple also caters to the non-Hindu devotees. Statues of Buddha and Quan Yin (Goddess of Mercy) have been set up for non-Hindu devotees who frequent the temple.

See also
List of Hindu temples in Singapore

References

External links

Official Website

Bukit Merah
Hindu temples in Singapore
Indian diaspora in Singapore
Tamil Singaporean